This is a list of diplomatic missions of Slovenia, excluding honorary consulates.

Current missions

Africa

Americas

Asia

Europe

Oceania

Multinational organizations

Gallery

Closed missions

Americas

Europe

See also

 Foreign relations of Slovenia
 List of diplomatic missions in Slovenia

Notes

References

 Ministry of Foreign Affairs of Slovenia

Diplomatic missions
Slovenia